The 2013–14 SIJHL season was the 13th season of the Superior International Junior Hockey League (SIJHL). The seven teams of the SIJHL played 56-game schedules.

Come February, the top teams of the league will play down for the Bill Salonen Cup, the SIJHL championship.  The winner of the Bill Salonen Cup will compete in the Central Canadian Junior "A" championship, the Dudley Hewitt Cup.  If successful against the winners of the Ontario Junior Hockey League and Northern Ontario Junior Hockey League, the champion would then move on to play in the Canadian Junior Hockey League championship, the 2014 Royal Bank Cup.

Changes 
Sioux Lookout Flyers do not return.
Wisconsin Wilderness leave for North American Hockey League.
Expansion granted to English River Miners of Ear Falls, Ontario.
Expansion granted to Wisconsin Wilderness of Spooner, Wisconsin.

Current Standings 
Note: GP = Games played; W = Wins; L = Losses; OTL = Overtime losses; SL = Shootout losses; GF = Goals for; GA = Goals against; PTS = Points; x = clinched playoff berth; y = clinched division title; z = clinched conference title

Teams listed on the official league website.

Standings listed on official league website.

2014 Bill Salonen Cup Playoffs

Super Series
Winner gets choice of opponent in semi-finals. Two-game goal total series.  If a draw after two games, the series goes to sudden death shootout.

Playoff results are listed on the official league website.

Dudley Hewitt Cup Championship
Hosted by the Wellington Dukes in Wellington, Ontario. Fort Frances Lakers represented the SIJHL and lost in the semi-final.

Round Robin
Toronto Lakeshore Patriots (OJHL) 4 - Fort Frances Lakers 1
Wellington Dukes (OJHL) 3 - Fort Frances Lakers 0
Fort Frances Lakers 6 - Kirkland Lake Gold Miners (NOJHL) 3

Semi-final
Toronto Lakeshore Patriots (OJHL) 6 - Fort Frances Lakers 0

Scoring leaders 
Note: GP = Games played; G = Goals; A = Assists; Pts = Points; PIM = Penalty minutes

Leading goaltenders 
Note: GP = Games played; Mins = Minutes played; W = Wins; L = Losses: OTL = Overtime losses; SL = Shootout losses; GA = Goals Allowed; SO = Shutouts; GAA = Goals against average

Players selected in 2014 NHL Entry Draft
To be decided after season concludes.

Awards
Player of the Year - Daniel Del Paggio (Thunder Bay)
Goalie of the Year - Eric Mann (Thunder Bay)
Defenceman of the Year - Austin Frank (Minnesota)
Rookie of the Year - Lucas Debenedet (Fort Frances)
Most Improved Player - Mason Meyer (Fort Frances)
Most Sportsmanlike Player - Matthias Gardiman (Thunder Bay)
Best Defensive Forward - Jonathon Losurdo (Minnesota)
Coach of the Year - Wayne Strachan (Fort Frances)
First All-Star Team - Lucas Debenedet (Fort Frances), Mason Meyer (Fort Frances), Daniel Del Paggio (Thunder Bay), Cody Wickstrom (Fort Frances), Austin Frank (Minnesota), Eric Mann (Fort Frances)
Second All-Star Team - Lyndon Lipinski (Fort Frances), Matthias Gardiman (Thunder Bay), Zach Grzelewski (Thunder Bay), Tim Kavanaugh (Dryden), Tim Cavar (Thunder Bay), Jordan Cartney (Fort Frances)

See also 
 2014 Royal Bank Cup
 Dudley Hewitt Cup
 Ontario Junior Hockey League
 Northern Ontario Junior Hockey League
 Greater Ontario Junior Hockey League
 2013 in ice hockey
 2014 in ice hockey

References

External links 
 Official website of the Superior International Junior Hockey League
 Official website of the Canadian Junior Hockey League

Superior International Junior Hockey League seasons
SIJHL
SIJHL